Mikko Einar Juva (22 November 1918 – 1 January 2004) was a Finnish historian, theologian and Lutheran archbishop.

Biography 
He was professor in Nordic history 1957–1962 at the University of Turku and professor in Finnish and Scandinavian history and church history at the University of Helsinki 1962–1978. He served as rector of the University of Helsinki from 1971 to 1973 and chancellor from 1973 to 1978. He was also a member of the Finnish parliament 1964–1966 and the chairman of Liberal People's Party 1965–1968.

In his youth Mikko Juva took part in the Student Christian Movement and was student minister 1948–1950. He was archbishop of Finland 1978–1982. The most important assignment was his presidency in the Lutheran World Federation 1970–1977. He also published writings in historical and church historical subjects.

He was the son of Einar W. Juva.

Published works 
  (1950) 
  (1960) 
  (5 parts, 1964–67, with Einar W. Juva)

References

1918 births
2004 deaths
People from Kokkola
Lutheran archbishops and bishops of Turku
People's Party of Finland (1951) politicians
Liberals (Finland) politicians
Members of the Parliament of Finland (1962–66)
Finnish Lutheran theologians
20th-century Finnish historians
Finnish military personnel of World War II
20th-century Protestant theologians
Finnish male writers
20th-century male writers
Rectors of the University of Helsinki
Chancellors of the University of Helsinki
Academic staff of the University of Turku